Three Canadian naval units have been named HMCS Fundy.

 , a  that served the Royal Canadian Navy from 1938 to 1945.
 , a  sold to France as La Dunkerquoise in 1954, stricken 1984.
 , a Bay-class minesweeper that served Canada from 1956 to 1996.

Battle honours
 Atlantic, 1939–45

References

 Government of Canada Ships' Histories - HMCS Fundy

See also
 , a Canadian minesweeper class

Royal Canadian Navy ship names